Spruceanthus is a genus of liverwort in family Lejeuneaceae. 

The genus was circumscribed by Frans Verdoorn in Ann. Bryol. Suppl. vol.4 on page 151 in 1934.

The genus name of Spruceanthus is in honour of Richard Spruce (1817–1893), who was an English botanist specializing in bryology. He was one of the great Victorian botanical explorers.

Species
As accepted by GBIF;

 Spruceanthus abbreviatus 
 Spruceanthus brachyanthus 
 Spruceanthus falcatus 
 Spruceanthus floreus 
 Spruceanthus kiushianus 
 Spruceanthus macrostipulus 
 Spruceanthus mamillilobulus 
 Spruceanthus olivaceus 
 Spruceanthus planifolius 
 Spruceanthus planiusculus 
 Spruceanthus pluriplicatus 
 Spruceanthus polonicus 
 Spruceanthus polymorphus 
 Spruceanthus semirepandus 
 Spruceanthus sulcatus 
 Spruceanthus theobromae 
 Spruceanthus thozetianus 
 Spruceanthus wiggintonii

References

Porellales genera
Lejeuneaceae
Taxonomy articles created by Polbot